Sixth sense or variants may refer to:

 Extrasensory perception, also called sixth sense

Film and television
 The Sixth Sense, a 1999 film
 The Sixth Sense (American TV series), a 1972 American TV series
 The Sixth Sense (Thai TV series), a 2012–2013 Thai TV series
 Sixth Sense (TV series), a 2020 South Korean variety television program
 Sixth Sense (game show), a 2018 Indian TV series

Music
 Sixth Sense (band), a music act associated with Storyhill

Albums
 Sixth Sense (Brown Eyed Girls album), 2011
 The Sixth Sense (Lee Morgan album), 1968
 The Sixth Sense (Don Pullen album), 1985
 The Sixth Sense, a 2013 album by Ai Kuwabara

Songs
 "Sixth Sense" (Brown Eyed Girls song), 2011
 "The 6th Sense", a 2000 song by Common
 "Sixth Sense", a song by Chicago from the 1975 album Chicago VIII
 "Sixth Sense", a song by Ofra Haza from the 1997 album Ofra Haza
 "Sixth Sense", a song by Royal Hunt from the 2010 album X
 "Sixth Sense", a song by Donna Lewis from the 2002 album Be Still 
 "Sixth Sense", a song by Imelda May from the 2017 album Life Love Flesh Blood
 "Sixth Sense", a song by Wire from the 1990 album Manscape

Other uses
 SixthSense, a 1990s gesture-based wearable computer system
 HTC Sense version 6, nicknamed "Sixth Sense"

See also

 Five senses (disambiguation)
 Sense of balance and proprioception (sense of body position), senses in addition to the usually considered "five senses"
 El Sexto Sentido (The Sixth Sense), a 2006 album by Thalía
 Āyatana, the six sense bases in Buddhism
 Sixx Sense, an American radio show hosted by Nikki Sixx